Hendrikus ("Hennie") Hollink (1 October 1931 in Glanerbrug, Overijssel – 31 January 2018) was a football (soccer) player and manager from the Netherlands, who played for Roda JC, FC Twente and Heracles Almelo. He played professional football himself in the 1950s and 1960s. He died on 31 January 2018.

Teams
FC Eindhoven (1967–1968)
HVC (later on SC Amersfoort)
Roda JC (1972–1974)
RC Strasbourg (1974–1976)
Heracles Almelo (1976–1979)
FC Twente (1979–1981)
FC Tours (1981–1983)
RBC Roosendaal (manager)

References

External links
Profile

1931 births
2018 deaths
Footballers from Enschede
Dutch footballers
Dutch football managers
Roda JC Kerkrade managers
FC Twente managers
RC Strasbourg Alsace managers
Tours FC managers
RBC Roosendaal managers
FC Eindhoven managers
Heracles Almelo managers

Association footballers not categorized by position
Roda JC Kerkrade players
Association football forwards
Dutch expatriate sportspeople in France
Dutch expatriate football managers
Expatriate football managers in France
Helmond Sport players